Edward Robert Betts III (born 26 November 1986) is a former Australian rules football player who played as a forward for Carlton and Adelaide in the Australian Football League. 

Betts was originally drafted by Carlton with pick No. 3 in the 2004 Pre-Season Draft, where he played for nine years before Adelaide signed him as a free agent at the end of 2013. He moved back to Carlton at the conclusion of the 2019 season, where he would finish his career at the end of the 2021 season having played a total of 350 games and kicked 640 goals. Betts now works as a development coach at the Geelong Football Club.

Early life and junior football
Betts was born in Port Lincoln, South Australia and raised by his mother in Kalgoorlie, Western Australia. He played junior football for the Mines Rovers Football Club, before moving back to Port Lincoln, where his father lived, to play for the Mallee Park Peckers. While in Port Lincoln, Betts' off-field behaviour was an issue, which included smoking, drinking, drugs and truancy. As a result, his mother arranged for the 15-year-old Betts to move to Melbourne and begin a TAFE program run by Indigenous former footballer Phil Krakouer.

In Melbourne, Betts played football for Templestowe, where he won the EFL Division 3 league best and fairest in 2002, and TAC Cup football for the Calder Cannons. He represented Vic Metro as a 16-year-old in the 2003 AFL Under 18 Championships and was selected in the Under 18 All-Australian team that season. He was too young to be selected in the AFL draft at the end of 2003, and he played another season with the Cannons, but was hindered by osteitis pubis. He was overlooked in the 2004 National Draft as a result.

Professional career

Carlton: 2005–2013

After being overlooked in the National Draft, Betts was recruited to the AFL with pick 3 in the 2004 Pre-Season Draft by the Carlton Football Club. He kicked 19 goals in 19 games in 2006, playing as a permanent small forward and becoming a fan favourite. The next year, Betts won the Goal of the Year for his goal in round 21 against , a banana kick from the boundary under pressure.

Throughout his first four seasons, Betts had a consistent output of roughly a goal per game. From 2009, Betts' goalkicking output increased, kicking 38 goals in 2009, then 42 in 2010 to top Carlton's goal kicking for the first time, while also making the top 10 in the club best and fairest. Betts started slowly in 2011, being on the cusp of being dropped early in the season, but rebounded to kick 50 goals for the season, including a career-best eight goals against Essendon in round 18.

Betts kicked 48 goals in 2012, stepping up in the absence of several of the Blues' key forwards to become their major forward target. In that year he led the club's goalkicking, was runner-up in the club best and fairest count and was named in the 40 man All-Australian shortlist for the second year in a row.

Betts kicked 27 goals in 18 games in a 2013 season interrupted by a suspension and a fractured jaw, including five goals in Carlton's two finals. At the end of the season, Betts entered the market as a restricted free agent, and in October he notified Carlton he had accepted a four-year contract understood to be worth about $2 million (AUS) to join the Adelaide Crows. Carlton had 72 hours to match the Crows offer but declined to do so, allowing the confirmation of Betts' switch to occur on 4 October, the first day of the free agency period.

Adelaide: 2014–2019

In his first season at Adelaide, Betts played all 22 games and kicked a career-best 51 goals, leading Adelaide's goalkicking table and finishing eighth in the Coleman Medal. He also had more goal assists than anyone else in the AFL and was ranked third in the league for tackles inside the forward 50. Betts played his 200th AFL game against  at Adelaide Oval in round 17.

On 26 May 2015, the AFL launched an inquiry into Betts' signing with Adelaide after the outgoing Carlton coach, Mick Malthouse, claimed to have been told by the current Carlton and former Adelaide CEO Steven Trigg that Adelaide had illegally signed Betts 18 months prior to him departing Carlton. Adelaide categorically denied the claim, as did Carlton and Betts' manager. Betts and all other parties were subsequently cleared of any wrongdoing in the affair. Following on from this controversy, Betts improved on his stellar 2014 season by kicking 63 goals in 2015, finishing third in the Coleman Medal, and finally achieving All-Australian honours. Betts also was awarded the Goal of the Year in 2015 for the second time in his career; against  in wet conditions, he managed to control the ball near the boundary at half-forward and kicked a left-foot torpedo punt from 50 metres out on the boundary line, which dribbled through for a goal.

In a Showdown in round 3, 2017, Betts was racially abused by a  club member. The offender was evicted from the ground and had his membership suspended indefinitely. In the Crows' next match, Betts was given the honour of tossing the coin before the match along with  player Anthony McDonald-Tipungwuti before kicking 6 goals, taking the lead in the Coleman Medal in the Crows' 65-point win. This included 5 first-half goals, and he and McDonald-Tipungwuti kicked 10 goals between them for the match. In round 7, he kicked his 500th career goal against  in the second quarter, before being flattened by defender Scott Thompson and immediately getting a set shot to kick his second goal in a row. Overall he got three goals for the match in spite of the Crows losing by 59 points. In August 2017, Betts was admitted to hospital with appendicitis and missed Adelaide's round 19 draw against Collingwood but returned the following week for the Showdown and kicked 4 goals, pushing up to second place on the overall Showdown leading goal-kickers list, only behind captain Taylor Walker. Betts was a part of Adelaide's losing Grand Final team that year, kicking one goal in the match. 

In 2018, Betts kicked only 29 goals for the year, making it his worst return in 5 years at the Crows. Also in 2018, Betts missed four matches due to hamstring injuries, having missed only one match in his previous four seasons at Adelaide.

On Round 5 of the 2019 season, he played in his 300th AFL game, against the Gold Coast Suns. In front of a roaring crowd and with 6 minutes left in what turned out to be an easy win, he scored a classic left-footed banana that won him an unparalleled 4th AFL Goal of the Year award.

Return to Carlton: 2020–2021
At the conclusion of the 2019 season, Betts was traded back to Carlton.

On 19 November 2019, Betts was given his previous jumper number at Carlton, no. 19, once again.

On 16 August 2021, Betts announced via Instagram he would be playing his final, and 350th game against the Giants on 21 August 2021. Betts was chaired off the ground in his final and 350th game against the Giants, when he officially retired from his playing career after the game.

Coaching career 
After his retirement, Betts began his job as a developmental coach at Geelong while also bringing in former Adelaide teammate and delisted player Tyson Stengle and turned him into a member of the 2022 All-Australian roster.

Personal life
While playing for Carlton, Betts taught part-time at Assumption College in Kilmore, Victoria.

Betts married his long-term partner, Anna Scullie, in a surprise wedding in August 2015, after several years' engagement. They have five children, three boys and twin daughters.

Publications
When Betts entered the AFL at 17 years of age, he had the reading and writing ability of a six to seven year old, and knows the challenges and disadvantage this can cause young people, leading him to create a series of educational books for children.  The books aim to help kids read with confidence and enjoyment and give them the chance to express their own personality into the story.  His first book, My Kind, is about spreading kindness and helping kids understand acceptance and equality. Since its release, the kindness movement has spread. My People, Betts' second book for children, is about sharing and educating kids on Aboriginal culture and Australia's First Nations peoples. Betts is often asked to visit schools to share his knowledge and experience.

Betts' memoir, The Boy from Boomerang Crescent, was published in August 2022.

Legacy
Then-coach Brenton Sanderson dubbed that area of the ground "Eddie’s Pocket", and the name has caught on with fans and commentators. Betts' 2015, 2016 and 2019 goal-of-the-year-winning goals were from the opposite pocket, the left forward pocket at the same end.

In September 2021 Australian musician Paul Kelly released a song inspired by Betts and his battle with racism, titled Every Step of the Way.

Statistics
 Statistics are calculated to end of the 2021 season

|- style="background:#eaeaea;"
! scope="row" style="text-align:center" | 2005
| style="text-align:center" | 
| 19 || 19 || 19 || 12 || 86 || 36 || 122 || 17 || 42 || 1.0 || 0.6 || 4.5 || 1.9 || 6.4 || 0.9 || 2.2 || 0
|- 
! scope="row" style="text-align:center" | 2006
| style="text-align:center" | 
| 19 || 21 || 20 || 10 || 128 || 100 || 228 || 58 || 70 || 1.0 || 0.5 || 6.1 || 4.8 || 10.9 || 2.8 || 3.3 || 0
|- style="background:#eaeaea;"
! scope="row" style="text-align:center" | 2007
| style="text-align:center" | 
| 19 || 17 || 21 || 11 || 108 || 94 || 202 || 44 || 66 || 1.2 || 0.7 || 6.4 || 5.5 || 11.9 || 2.6 || 3.6 || 0
|- 
! scope="row" style="text-align:center" | 2008
| style="text-align:center" | 
| 19 || 18 || 25 || 10 || 143 || 90 || 233 || 62 || 33 || 1.4 || 0.6 || 7.9 || 5.0 || 12.9 || 3.4 || 1.8 || 0
|- style="background:#eaeaea;"
! scope="row" style="text-align:center" | 2009
| style="text-align:center" | 
| 19 || 22 || 38 || 21 || 156 || 109 || 265 || 55 || 78 || 1.7 || 1.0 || 7.1 || 5.0 || 12.1 || 2.5 || 3.6 || 2
|-
! scope="row" style="text-align:center" | 2010
| style="text-align:center" | 
| 19 || 23 || 42 || 29 || 178 || 140 || 318 || 91 || 76 || 1.8 || 1.3 || 7.7 || 6.1 || 13.8 || 4.0 || 3.3 || 3
|- style="background:#eaeaea;"
! scope="row" style="text-align:center" | 2011
| style="text-align:center" | 
| 19 || 24 || 50 || 22 || 176 || 121 || 297 || 90 || 84 || 2.1 || 0.9 || 7.3 || 5.0 || 12.4 || 3.8 || 3.5 || 4
|- 
! scope="row" style="text-align:center" | 2012
| style="text-align:center" | 
| 19 || 22 || 48 || 30 || 182 || 103 || 285 || 72 || 62 || 2.2 || 1.4 || 8.3 || 4.7 || 13.0 || 3.3 || 2.8 || 1
|- style="background:#eaeaea;"
! scope="row" style="text-align:center" | 2013
| style="text-align:center" | 
| 19 || 18 || 27 || 15 || 125 || 85 || 210 || 49 || 61 || 1.5 || 0.8 || 6.9 || 4.7 || 11.7 || 2.7 || 3.4 || 0
|- 
! scope="row" style="text-align:center" | 2014
| style="text-align:center" | 
| 18 || 22 || 51 || 22 || 167 || 123 || 290 || 53 || 74 || 2.3 || 1.0 || 7.6 || 5.6 || 13.2 || 2.4 || 3.4 || 4
|- style="background:#eaeaea;"
! scope="row" style="text-align:center" | 2015
| style="text-align:center" | 
| 18 || 23 || 63 || 25 || 213 || 99 || 312 || 84 || 65 || 2.7 || 1.1 || 9.3 || 4.3 || 13.6 || 3.7 || 2.8 || 7
|- 
! scope="row" style="text-align:center" | 2016
| style="text-align:center" | 
| 18 || 24 || 75 || 31 || 231 || 89 || 320 || 79 || 85 || 3.1 || 1.3 || 9.6 || 3.7 || 13.3 || 3.3 || 3.5 || 10
|- style="background:#eaeaea;"
! scope="row" style="text-align:center" | 2017
| style="text-align:center" | 
| 18 || 24 || 55 || 34 || 210 || 108 || 318 || 78 || 80 || 2.3 || 1.4 || 8.8 || 4.5 || 13.3 || 3.3 || 3.3 || 5
|- 
! scope="row" style="text-align:center" | 2018
| style="text-align:center" | 
| 18 || 18 || 29 || 20 || 143 || 96 || 239 || 43 || 50 || 1.6 || 1.1 || 7.9 || 5.3 || 13.3 || 2.4 || 2.8 || 1
|- style="background:#eaeaea;"
! scope="row" style="text-align:center" | 2019
| style="text-align:center" | 
| 18 || 21 || 37 || 21 || 155 || 96 || 251 || 49 || 52 || 1.8 || 1.0 || 7.4 || 4.6 || 12.0 || 2.3 || 2.5 || 5
|- 
! scope="row" style="text-align:center" | 2020
| style="text-align:center" | 
| 19 || 15 || 13 || 13 || 89 || 44 || 133 || 24 || 41 || 0.8 || 0.8 || 5.9 || 2.9 || 8.8 || 1.6 || 2.7 || 3
|- style="background:#eaeaea;"
! scope="row" style="text-align:center" | 2021
| style="text-align:center" | 
| 19 || 19 || 27 || 16 || 121 || 59 || 180 || 42 || 31 || 1.4 || 0.8 || 6.4 || 3.1 || 9.5 || 2.2 || 1.6 || 0
|- style="background:#eaeaea;"
|- 
|- class="sortbottom"
! colspan=3| Career
! 350
! 640
! 342
! 2611
! 1592
! 4203
! 990
! 1050
! 1.8
! 1.0
! 7.5
! 4.6
! 12.0
! 2.8
! 3.0
! 45
|}

References

External links

Eddie Betts Profile in Blueseum
Eddie Betts' page at agent W Sports & Media

1986 births
Living people
Adelaide Football Club players
Australian autobiographers
Carlton Football Club players
Mines Rovers Football Club players
Calder Cannons players
All-Australians (AFL)
Indigenous Australian players of Australian rules football
Australian rules footballers from South Australia
Indigenous Australians from Western Australia
Australian rules footballers from Western Australia
People from Kalgoorlie
People from Port Lincoln
Australia international rules football team players